Araca is a town in Cairoma Municipality, Loayza Province of La Paz Department, Bolivia.

In 1950 it had about 2,700 inhabitants. It was formerly a tin mining center. The polylepis racemosa tree, a vulnerable species, is endemic to this area in Bolivia.

References

 

Populated places in La Paz Department (Bolivia)